Players and pairs who neither have high enough rankings nor receive wild cards may participate in a qualifying tournament held one week before the annual Wimbledon Tennis Championships.

Seeds

  Barbara Schwartz /  Jasmin Wöhr (qualifying competition, lucky losers)
  Gulnara Fattakhetdinova /  İpek Şenoğlu (first round)
  Lubomira Bacheva /  Eva Birnerová (qualified)
  Amanda Augustus /  Natalie Grandin (qualifying competition, lucky losers)
  Leanne Baker /  Nicole Sewell (qualified)
  Līga Dekmeijere /  Stéphanie Foretz (first round)
  Mariya Koryttseva /  Galina Voskoboeva (qualifying competition)
  Evie Dominikovic /  Anastasia Rodionova (qualified)

Qualifiers

  Leanne Baker /  Nicole Sewell
  Jeon Mi-ra /  Yuka Yoshida
  Lubomira Bacheva /  Eva Birnerová
  Evie Dominikovic /  Anastasia Rodionova

Lucky losers

  Barbara Schwartz /  Jasmin Wöhr
  Amanda Augustus /  Natalie Grandin
  Claire Curran /  Jane O'Donoghue

Qualifying draw

First qualifier

Second qualifier

Third qualifier

Fourth qualifier

External links

2004 Wimbledon Championships on WTAtennis.com
2004 Wimbledon Championships – Women's draws and results at the International Tennis Federation

Women's Doubles Qualifying
Wimbledon Championship by year – Women's doubles qualifying
Wimbledon Championships